An Exciter is an electroacoustic transducer. Exciters differ from the more common loudspeaker in that they have no cone and rely on being connected to a surface or object that can be used as a resonator via a mechanical connection. They have been used in several projects with novel resonators and are readily available from several supplies.

References

External links

 Demonstration and explanation video about audio speakers exciters possibilities

 
Music technology
Consumer electronics